Saint Jordan or Blessed Jordan may refer to:

Saint Jordan the Wonderworker, remembered in the Eastern Orthodox church on May 2
Saint Jordan of Bristol, venerated in England
Blessed Jordan of Saxony (d. 1237), early leader of the Dominican Order
Blessed Giordano Forzatè (d. 1248), Paduan religious whose body lies uncorrupted in Venice
Blessed Jordan of Pisa (d. 1311), Dominican theologian
Saint Giordano Ansaloni (d. 1634), Dominican missionary martyred in Japan
Saint Jordan of Trebizond (d. 1650), remembered in the  Eastern Orthodox church on February 2